Edward Joseph Callahan  (December 11, 1857 – February 5, 1947) was an American professional baseball outfielder and shortstop. He played for three teams in the Union Association in 1884.

External links

Major League Baseball outfielders
Major League Baseball shortstops
St. Louis Maroons players
Kansas City Cowboys (UA) players
Boston Reds (UA) players
19th-century baseball players
Baseball players from Boston
1857 births
1947 deaths